The Greater Cleveland Regional Transit Authority (officially the GCRTA, but historically and locally referred to as the RTA) is the public transit agency for Cleveland, Ohio, United States and the surrounding suburbs of Cuyahoga County. RTA is the largest transit agency in Ohio, providing over 44 million trips to residents and visitors of the Cleveland area in 2010. RTA owns and operates the RTA Rapid Transit rail system (called "The Rapid" by area residents), which consists of one heavy rail line (the Red Line) and three light rail lines (Blue, Green, Waterfront). The bulk of RTA's service consists of buses, including regular routes, express or flyer buses, loop and paratransit buses. In December 2004, RTA adopted a revised master plan, Transit 2025, in which several rail extensions, bus line improvements and transit oriented developments are discussed.

RTA's major predecessor, the Cleveland Transit System, was the first transit system in the western hemisphere to provide direct rapid transit service from a city's downtown to its major airport.

In 2007, RTA was named the best public transit system in North America by the American Public Transportation Association, for "demonstrating achievement in efficiency and effectiveness."

History 

The GCRTA was established December 30, 1974, and on September 5, 1975 assumed control of the Cleveland Transit System, which operated the heavy rail line from Windermere to Cleveland Hopkins Airport and the local bus systems, and Shaker Heights Rapid Transit (the descendant of a separate streetcar system formed by the Van Sweringen brothers to serve their Shaker Heights development), which operated the two interurban light rail lines from downtown to Shaker Heights.  CTS had been formed when the city of Cleveland took over the old Cleveland Railway Company.  However, with Cleveland's dwindling population over the previous two decades, its revenue dwindled significantly.  The problem really manifested itself with a 17-day strike in July 1970.  City and county leaders concluded that a regional approach was the only way to save it.

A month after its formation, RTA assumed control over the suburban bus systems operated by Maple Heights, North Olmsted, Brecksville, Garfield Heights and Euclid.

The RTA had to undertake a number of renovations to the rail system, as the Shaker Heights lines (renamed the Blue and Green lines) had not been significantly renovated since their creation in 1920. They were largely rebuilt by 1981 and the downtown station at Cleveland Union Terminal, later renamed Tower City Center, was heavily rebuilt by 1987. In 1994, a walkway and skyway was added from the Tower City station to the Gateway Sports and Entertainment Complex and the Blue and Green lines were extended to the North Coast Harbor area by 1996.

Seventy-five Cleveland Transit System PCC streetcars were sold in 1952 to Toronto to be used by the Toronto Transit Commission (TTC). The last of the Cleveland PCC models operated for 30 years in Toronto, until 1982. Cleveland Transit also sold eight Marmon-Herrington TC44 trolleybuses in 1963 to the TTC.

RTA has equipped all of its mainline buses with bicycle carriers. Each bus can carry two to three bicycles. Bicycles are also allowed on rapid transit trains (with a maximum limit of two per car) at all times, although operators have discretion to refuse bicycles if a train is overcrowded. Bicycles are not allowed access to/from the Public Square/Tower City Station through the shopping areas of Tower City Center.  However, an elevator connection is permitted between the station lobby and street level, at Prospect Avenue via the south-side doors. Bicycles are also allowed to transfer between trains at Tower City Station. There is no additional charge for taking bicycles on RTA.
In 2005, RTA began building a bus rapid transit line along Euclid Avenue from Public Square to University Circle and then to East Cleveland. This was originally to be a subway line running under Euclid Avenue, but the high cost of such a project caused it to be reduced in scope, resulting in the current bus rapid transit project. Vehicles operate in an exclusive center median busway from Public Square to Stokes Blvd. and transition to curbside running through University Circle to the Windermere Rapid Transit Station in East Cleveland. The vehicles are low-floor, articulated  buses.

Naming rights for the line were purchased by the Cleveland Clinic and University Hospitals for twenty-five years. The BRT route, originally named the "Silver Line", which serves the two major health industry employers in Cleveland, is named the HealthLine.

As sections were completed, they were opened to traffic; the entire stretch within the project area was open by October 24, 2008 as part of its grand opening October 24–26, 2008.

List of bus routes 
Routes as of November 18, 2022

Funding 
When RTA was formed, Cuyahoga County voters approved a 1% county-wide sales tax, which constitutes about 70% of its operating revenue. This funding source has helped RTA maintain a higher level of service than other transit agencies in comparable cities and it also helps RTA retain some degree of political autonomy. However, it also makes RTA unusually susceptible to economic downturns.

In recent years, RTA has undertaken great efforts to improve efficiency and eliminate unnecessary costs. These efforts have included mergers with the two remaining autonomous transit agencies in Cuyahoga County, the North Olmsted Municipal Bus Line and Maple Heights Transit, and the redesigning of its routes in the suburban areas southeast, west, and south of Cuyahoga County.

CTS fleet 
 1946 Pullman PCC A11 (50) and 1946 St. Louis Car Company A12 (25) – all sold to Toronto in 1952 and all retired by TTC.
 Marmon-Herrington TC48-T5 and TC44-T7 trolleybus – ordered 49 in 1951 and 1952 and retired in 1960s (sold to Mexico City's Servicio de Transportes Eléctricos and since retired)

See also 
Cleveland railroad history
Great American Streetcar Scandal
Laketran (Lake County)
Lorain County Transit
Akron, Bedford and Cleveland Railroad

References

External links 

 Greater Cleveland Regional Transit Authority
 Euclid Corridor Transportation Project 
 RTA HealthLine website

 
Transportation in Cleveland
Transportation in Cuyahoga County, Ohio
Bus transportation in Ohio
Government agencies established in 1974
Passenger rail transportation in Ohio
Intermodal transportation authorities in Ohio
1974 establishments in Ohio